Cryptotylus is a genus of horse flies in the family Tabanidae.

Species
Cryptotylus aeratus Philip & Fairchild, 1956
Cryptotylus cauri Stone, 1944
Cryptotylus chloroticus Philip & Fairchild, 1956
Cryptotylus stonei Maldonado Capriles, 1955
Cryptotylus unicolor (Wiedemann, 1828)
Cryptotylus xikrin Gorayeb & Fairchild, 1985

References

Tabanidae
Brachycera genera
Diptera of South America
Taxa named by Adolfo Lutz